Alexis William Kampouris (November 13, 1912 – May 29, 1993), was a professional baseball player who played in the Major Leagues primarily as a second baseman from 1934 to 1939 and 1941 to 1943.

In 708 games over nine seasons, Kampouris posted a .243 batting average (531-for-2182) with 272 runs, 45 home runs, 284 RBI and 244 bases on balls. He recorded an overall .962 fielding percentage.

Miscellaneous facts
 Kampouris is considered the first ever Major League player of Greek descent.
 On May 9, 1937, Kampouris hit three home runs in one game for the Reds against the Philadelphia Phillies.
 On August 13, 1937, Kampouris was honored at Wrigley Field by the Chicago Hellenic Society as a visiting member of the Reds. He was given a car and praised before the game, only to commit three errors in one inning against the Cubs that day.

References

External links

1912 births
1993 deaths
American people of Greek descent
Major League Baseball second basemen
Cincinnati Reds players
New York Giants (NL) players
Brooklyn Dodgers players
Washington Senators (1901–1960) players
Baseball players from Sacramento, California
Sacramento Senators players
Newark Bears (IL) players
Montreal Royals players
Sacramento Solons players